The 2015 The Jewish Home leadership election was held on 14 January 2015 to elect the leader of The Jewish Home party. The election took place in advance of the 2015 Israeli legislative election. Incumbent leader Naftali Bennett was handily reelected. 

The election coincided with the primaries that determined the party's 2015 legislative election party list.

Candidates
Naftali Bennett, incumbent party leader
Shimon Or, rabbi

Results

Aftermath
There were later, in 2019, news reports of a potential police probe into potential unreported funds received by Bennetts 2012 leadership campaign.

References

Jewish Home leadership
2015
Jewish Home
Jewish Home leadership election
2015 Jewish Home leadership election